Cool Springs, CoolSprings, and Cool Spring may refer to:

Cool Spring, Delaware
Cool Springs (Missouri)
Cool Spring, South Carolina
 Cool Springs (Carvers Creek, North Carolina), listed on the NRHP in North Carolina
 Cool Springs (Camden, South Carolina), listed on the NRHP in South Carolina
 Cool Springs (Nashville, Tennessee), an edge city in greater Nashville, Tennessee
CoolSprings Galleria
 Cool Spring Farm (Charles Town, West Virginia)
 Cool Spring Farm (Gerrardstown, West Virginia)
 Cool Spring Place

See also
Battle of Cool Spring